Mike Willem Frank van de Goor (born 14 May 1973 in Oss) is a volleyball player from the Netherlands, who represented his native country at three consecutive Summer Olympics, starting in 1996. As a reserve-player he won the gold medal at his Olympic debut, alongside his older brother and twice Olympian Bas.

After having finished in fifth place in Sydney, Australia, Van de Goor ended up in ninth place with the Dutch Men's National Team four years later in Athens, Greece.

References
  Dutch Olympic Committee

1973 births
Living people
Dutch men's volleyball players
Volleyball players at the 1996 Summer Olympics
Volleyball players at the 2000 Summer Olympics
Volleyball players at the 2004 Summer Olympics
Olympic gold medalists for the Netherlands
Olympic volleyball players of the Netherlands
Sportspeople from Oss
Olympic medalists in volleyball
Medalists at the 1996 Summer Olympics
20th-century Dutch people
21st-century Dutch people

 Mike Van de Goor in Men Volley Box